2 Samuel 6 is the sixth chapter of the Second Book of Samuel in the Old Testament of the Christian Bible or the second part of Books of Samuel in the Hebrew Bible. According to Jewish tradition  the book was attributed to the prophet Samuel, with additions by the prophets Gad and Nathan, but modern scholars view it as a composition of a number of independent texts of various ages from c. 630–540 BCE. This chapter contains the account of David's reign in Jerusalem. This is within a section comprising 2 Samuel 2–8 which deals with the period when David set up his kingdom.

Text
This chapter was originally written in the Hebrew language. It is divided into 23 verses.

Textual witnesses
Some early manuscripts containing the text of this chapter in Hebrew are of the Masoretic Text tradition, which includes the Codex Cairensis (895), Aleppo Codex (10th century), and Codex Leningradensis (1008). Fragments containing parts of this chapter in Hebrew were found among the Dead Sea Scrolls including 4Q51 (4QSam; 100–50 BCE) with extant verses 2–18. 

Extant ancient manuscripts of a translation into Koine Greek known as the Septuagint (originally was made in the last few centuries BCE) include Codex Vaticanus (B; B; 4th century) and Codex Alexandrinus (A; A; 5th century).

Old Testament references
: 
: ;

Places 

Baale of Judah
City of David
Gibeah
Jerusalem
Perez-uzzah

Analysis
The chapter has the following structure:
A. David gathered the people to bring up the ark: Celebrations began (6:1–5)
B. Interruption: Uzzah's death; celebrations suspended (6:6–11)
C. The ark entered the City of David: joy and offerings (6:12–15)
B'. Interruption: Michal despised David (6:16)
A'. The reception of the ark: David blessed the people and the people went home (6:17–19)
Epilogue. Confrontation between Michal and David (6:20–23)

The center of the narrative was the entrance of the Ark of the Covenant into the City of David with proper religious solemnity. The conclusion (A') was when David blessed the people, invoking "the name of the Lord of hosts" (verse 18) which was introduced at the start of celebrations (A; verse 2). The A C A' structure is replete with 'festive language' that is not found in the 'interruptions' nor 'epilogue'.

Taking the Ark to Jerusalem (6:1–11)
Verses 1–19 of this chapter is a continuation of the ark narrative in 1 Samuel 4:1–7:1, although it may not be a continuous piece as there are significant differences in the names of place and persons, as well as the characters of the narratives. Chronologically David could be in a position to bring the ark to Jerusalem only after a decisive victory over the Philistines (such as the one recorded in 1 Samuel 5:17–25). Since its return from the Philistines (1 Samuel 7:1), the Ark of the Covenant had presumably remained in Kirjath-Jearim, known in this passage as "Baale-judah" (4QSam has 'Baalah'). Similarity to 1 Samuel 4:4 can be observed in referring the ark as 'the ark of God [YHWH]', and YHWH as 'enthroned on the cherubim', whereas 'new cart' echoes 1 Samuel 6:7. 'The house of Abinadab' is also known from 1 Samuel 7:1, but his sons 'Uzzah and Ahio' appear here instead of 'Eleazar', who was in charge of the ark in the previous narrative. The transport of the ark was an occasion of joy and celebration, as David and his people dancing vigorously ('with all his strength' in verse 14 and 1 Chronicles 13:8 in Hebrew 'with instruments of might') accompanied with 'songs' (following 4QSam, Septuagint and 1 Chronicles 13:8, instead of 'fir-trees' in Masoretic Text), but it was interrupted by Uzzah's sudden death when he touched the ark, due to the same power that brought plagues upon the Philistines (1 Samuel 5) and devastation to the town of Beth-shemesh (1 Samuel 6:19). David was unwilling to take more risks, so the ark was left for three months at the place of Obed-Edom the Gittite, one of David's loyal servants since his time in Ziklag, who was a non-Israelite (and possibly a worshipper of another god), but willingly
housed the ark.

Verse 2
And David arose and went with all the people who were with him from Baale Judah to bring up from there the ark of God, whose name is called by the Name, the LORD of Hosts, who dwells between the cherubim.
"Baale Judah": also known as Baalah or Kirjathbaal, a city in the tribe of Judah, and the same with Kiriath-Jearim (Joshua 15:9; 1 Chronicles 13:6). After the return from the Philistines, the ark was transported from Bethshemesh to this place (1 Samuel 7:1) and remained there until this time, nearly fifty years.

Verse 3
So they set the ark of God on a new cart, and brought it out of the house of Abinadab, which was on the hill; and Uzzah and Ahio, the sons of Abinadab, drove the new cart.
"A new cart": after these words, Septuagint has an addition "with the ark". The use of cart might be intended as a mark of respect (cf. 1 Samuel 6:7), but it was against the words of Torah (Numbers 7:9) that requires the ark to be carried by the Levites, although this might to be considered impractical at the time due to the condition of the terrain ("on the hill").
"House of Abinadab": At this time Abinadab himself may have been long dead, so Uzzah and Ahio could be either his sons, now advanced in life, or his grandsons.
"On the hill": rendered in KJV and some English versions as "in Gibeah" (cf.  1 Samuel 7:1.

The Ark of the Covenant entered Jerusalem (6:12–23)
Despite some bitter experience with the ark, David was adamant to bring it to Jerusalem, this time with a blessing (verse 12), and again with much celebration and sacrifice. As the ark finally entered Jerusalem, the celebration reached its peak, with David, only wearing 'a linen ephod' (a priestly garment, which only covered the body and loins), leading vigorous circular dances with the assembly of people accompanied by blasts on the trumpet, the sopar or ram's horn for this joyous event. The ark was housed in a tent specially made for it by David (verse 17), not the same as the original wilderness 'tabernacle', but was probably constructed with some features that were later adopted when constructing the Temple for the ark. The whole festive ceremony was concluded with sacrifices, blessings, and gifts; it may well become annually repeated celebrations. Psalm 132 could be based on the story of the transfer of the ark to Jerusalem in this chapter (not having any referrals only found in parallel chapters).

Michal, Saul's daughter and David's first wife, was not pleased with the scantily clothed David dancing ("exposed himself") to 'his servants' maids', among the people (her story was inserted in verse 16 and continued in verses 19–23). She rebuked David with an irony that 'the king honoring himself', but David vowed to make himself even 'more contemptible than this' in showing his piety to YHWH. The statement in verse 23 of Michal's childlessness is significant in relation to David's relations with the house of Saul and with David's own descendants.

Verse 13
And so it was, when those bearing the ark of the Lord had gone six paces, that he sacrificed oxen and fatted sheep.
"Had gone six paces" refers to 'repeated sacrifice every six steps', not just one sacrifice after the first six steps.

See also

Related Bible parts: 1 Samuel 4, 1 Samuel 5, 1 Samuel 6, 1 Samuel 7, 1 Chronicles 12, 1 Chronicles 13, 1 Chronicles 15, 1 Chronicles 16, Psalm 132

Notes

References

Sources

Commentaries on Samuel

General

External links
 Jewish translations:
 Samuel II - II Samuel - Chapter 6 (Judaica Press). Hebrew text and English translation [with Rashi's commentary] at Chabad.org
 Christian translations:
 Online Bible at GospelHall.org (ESV, KJV, Darby, American Standard Version, Bible in Basic English)
 2 Samuel chapter 6. Bible Gateway

06
Ark of the Covenant